Rosette is the French diminutive of rose. It may refer to:

Flower shaped designs
 Rosette (award), a mark awarded by an organisation
 Rosette (design), a small flower design 
hence, various flower-shaped or rotational symmetric forms:
 Rosette (decoration), a small circular device that can be awarded with medal
 Rosette (politics), worn by political candidates in an election
 Rosette, a type of chain stitch in sewing
 Rose window, a Gothic circular architectonic component cut most frequently in shape similar to a rose
 Rosette (botany), a circular arrangement of leaves
 Rosette (zoology), markings like those of a jaguar
 a structure near the beak of some birds
 Pliska rosette, an ancient bronze artifact found in Pliska, Bulgaria in 1961
 Rosette sampler, a circular arrangement of Nansen bottles
 a trophy attached on the head of a bull in the French course camarguaise bullfighting event
 Klemperer rosette, a term used in interstellar cosmology and science fiction to indicate a group of cosmic bodies in a gravitational relationship.
 Rosette (music), soundhole decoration on musical instruments.

Placename
 Rosetta, aka Rosetta or Rashid, a port city on the Mediterranean coast
 Rosette, Utah, an unincorporated ranching community in Box Elder County, United States
 a site near Round Hill, Nova Scotia, Canada
 La Rosette, a settlement in Guadeloupe in the commune of Le Moule, on the island of Grande-Terre
 Sainte-Rosette, New Brunswick, an unincorporated community in Gloucester County, Canada

People
 Rosette (actress) (real name Françoise Quéré, born 1959), a French actress
 La Belle Rosette, real name Beryl McBurnie (1915–2000), a Trinidadian dance legend
 Rosette Bir (1926–1992), French sculptor
 Rosette Anday
 Rosette Sharma (born 1982), Canadian singer, songwriter and actress
 Clinton Rosette (1850–1909), prominent citizen of DeKalb, Illinois

Fictional characters
 Rosette Lambert in The Secret of Rosette Lambert, a 1920 French film by Raymond Bernard
 Rosette Christopher, the protagonist of the Chrono Crusade anime and manga series
 Princess Rosette, a French literary fairy tale written by Madame d'Aulnoy
 Rosette, a character in Manon, an opéra comique in five acts by Jules Massenet

Food
 Rosette (grape), a wine grape variety
Rufete (grape), a Portuguese/Spanish wine grape variety that is also known as Rosette
 Rosette (cookie), a thin crispy moulded cookie apparently of Scandinavian origin
 Rosette, a white Bergerac wine
 Rosette de Lyon, a French pork saucisson or sausage
 a dish from Emalia-Romagna consisting of a pasta filled with bechamel, cream, ham and others: see List of Italian dishes#Emilia-Romagna
 a kind of bread from Italian province of Veneto

Music
 Rosette (album), an album by Japanese singer Shizuka Kudō

Scientific names which include the element "rosette"
 a Point group in geometry is also known as a rosette group
 Rosette Nebula, a nebula in the Monoceros constellation
 Rosette sampler, a device used to assess water quality
 Gypsum rosette, an alternative name for a Desert rose (crystal)
 Klemperer rosette, a symmetrical arrangement of orbiting bodies arranged around a common center of mass
 The Rosette terminal complex is a structure in vascular plants that produces cellulose
 Erythrocyte rosetting is formation of red blood cells arranging themselves around a central cell so that the entire cluster looks more or less like a flower
 Rosette or palisade (pathology) of cells in a halo or spoken-wheel arrangement
 Furstenberg's rosette, an anatomical structure located in the internal streak canal of the teat
 Mossy fiber (cerebellum) is sometimes called a mossy fiber rosette
 The anterior olfactory nucleus of fishes can be called the olfactory rosette
 A rosette agent is Sphaerothecum destruens, a protist parasite of fish
 Rosette (schizont appearance), a formation characteristic of schizonts in protozoal infections by the reptile parasites Plasmodium tropiduri and P. holaspi or fish parasite Babesiosoma
 Groundnut rosette virus, a plant pathogenic virus
 Peach rosette mosaic virus, a plant pathogenic virus
 Rose rosette disease, a disease of the rose caused by a phytoplasm: see list of pests and diseases of roses
 CD2, a protein also known as rosette receptor

Similar spellings
 Claudia Rosett, an American writer and journalist
 Rosete (disambiguation)
 Roset (disambiguation)
 Rozet (disambiguation)
 Rozetes, symbols of the Eleusinian cult visible at the Archaeological Museum of Eleusis, Greece
 Roxette, a Swedish pop duo

See also
 
 Rosetta (disambiguation)
 Rosetti, a disambiguation page
 Rose (disambiguation)
 Compass rose, a graphic device indicating directions on a map, primarily North
 The White Rosette, a 1916 American silent short romantic film directed by Tom Ricketts